The Eider Islands are an uninhabited Canadian Arctic islands group in the Qikiqtaaluk Region of Nunavut, Canada. The 172 small islands are located in western Ungava Bay off the northern coast of Quebec. The closest community is Quaqtaq, Quebec,  to the northwest.

They should not be confused with Eider Island, which lies in Chesterfield Inlet, Nunavut, just southeast of Little Big Island.

Geography
The underlying solid rock of these islands is a granitic gneiss.

Flora
A thin soil layer supports Arctic willow, crowberry, sedge, lichen and moss.

Fauna
The Eider Islands are a Canadian Important Bird Area (#NU026). The notable bird species is the common eider.

References

External links 
 Eider Islands in the Atlas of Canada - Toporama; Natural Resources Canada
 Eider Island in the Atlas of Canada - Toporama; Natural Resources Canada

Uninhabited islands of Qikiqtaaluk Region
Archipelagoes of the Canadian Arctic Archipelago
Important Bird Areas of Qikiqtaaluk Region